Engineering Week may refer to:

Engineering Week (Canada), an annual event held by engineering schools throughout Canada.
National Engineering Week (Canada), held by the Canadian Council of Professional Engineers.
National Engineers Week (U.S.), held in the United States.